Walter Trusendi and Matteo Viola were the defending champions but chose not to participate.
Italians Claudio Grassi and Riccardo Ghedin won the title over Germans Gero Kretschmer and Alexander Satschko 6–4, 6–4

Seeds

Draw

Draw

References
 Main Draw

Morocco Tennis Tour - Casablanca
2013 Doubles
2013 Morocco Tennis Tour